The African dusky shrew or African foggy shrew (Crocidura caliginea) is a species of shrew. It is native to the Democratic Republic of the Congo, where it lives in forests.

References

Crocidura
Mammals of the Democratic Republic of the Congo
Mammals described in 1916
Taxonomy articles created by Polbot
Northeastern Congolian lowland forests
Endemic fauna of the Democratic Republic of the Congo